Melody Millicent Danquah (6 January 1937 – 18 March 2016) was a Ghanaian pilot and the first female pilot in Ghana as well as one of the earliest in Africa. She followed in the footsteps of Lotfia Elnadi who was the first Egyptian woman as well as the first woman from Africa to earn a pilot's license on 27 September 1933.

Early life
Melody Danquah was born in Larteh Akuapem, on 6 January 1937 to Ibinijah Rexford Addo-Danquah, who was the illustrious Court Registrar and Arbitrator of Larteh. Her mother was Selina Gyamfi. Melody was the sixth of 10 siblings.

Education
Danquah was educated at the Methodist Primary and Middle schools in Larteh and Wesley Girls High School in Cape Coast. She was also a product of the Government Secretarial School.

Career
She was chosen among the first three women towards the end of 1963 to be trained into the Ghana Air Force as pilots.
She successfully made the grade and the subsequent basic military training at the Ghana Military Academy. On 22 June 1964, Flt. Cadet Danquah flew solo for the first time in a de Havilland Canada DHC-1 Chipmunk aircraft, becoming the first Ghanaian to fly an aeroplane solo. She received her Wings qualifying her as a pilot from Kofi Baako who was the Minister of Defence on 15 April 1965. She ended her flying career in June 1968 and began to do administrative work in the Force. In 1984, she was discharged due to the state of her health. She received a Long Service award and The Efficiency Medal.

Life after active service 
After she retired from the military, she worked for the World Food Programme for a brief period and then the National Service Secretariat. At the age of 60, she earned a Diploma in Bible Studies and Theology and began to preach to military audiences. She later joined the Board of Directors for the Ghana Institute of Management and Public Administration.

Acknowledgements 
She was mentioned by Mrs. Rebeca Akufo-Addo, the first lady of Ghana during the 2017 International Women's Day celebrations for being an inspiration to women. She was honored with The Companion of the Order of the Volta in 2006, by President John Kufuor for being a courageous pacesetter.

References

External links
Melody Millicent Danquah, first female Ghanaian pilot

1937 births
2016 deaths
Ghanaian aviators
Women aviators
Aviation pioneers
Ghana Air Force personnel
Recipients of the Order of the Volta